Culdocentesis is a medical procedure involving the extraction of fluid from the pouch of Douglas (a rectouterine pouch posterior to the vagina) through a needle. It can be one diagnostic technique used in identifying pelvic inflammatory disease (in which case purulent fluid will be extracted) and ruptured ectopic pregnancies that cause hemoperitoneum.

In the procedure, the rectouterine pouch is often reached through the posterior fornix of the vagina. The process of creating the hole is called colpotomy if a scalpel incision is made to drain the fluid rather than using a needle.

See also 
 amniocentesis
 colposcopy
 culdoscopy

References

External links 
 
 "Culdocentesis and colpotomy" at World Health Organization
 

Female genital procedures